Gioconda ("the joyful one") may refer to:
Giaconda (pharmaceutical company), an Australian biotechnology company
 Gioconda cafe, patronised by musicians such as David Bowie and Elton John
 La Gioconda (play), tragedy by Gabriele d'Annunzio
 La Gioconda (opera), an 1876 opera by Amilcare Ponchielli
 Mona Lisa or La Gioconda, a painting by Leonardo da Vinci